Pulvinaria  may refer to:
 Pulvinaria (fungus), a fungus genus in the class Sordariomycetes
 Pulvinaria (insect), a scale insect genus in the family Coccidae
 Toxorhina pulvinaria, a crane fly species in the genus Toxorhina
 pulvinaria (Latin plural), couches for the gods used in religious rituals; see Glossary of ancient Roman religion#pulvinar

Genus disambiguation pages